Embrace Home Loans Inc., formerly Advanced Financial Services Inc. (AFS), is an American full service direct mortgage lender. It is headquartered in Newport, Rhode Island. Embrace provides residential mortgage loans directly to its  customers and is licensed in 46 states and Washington, D.C. The company employs 600+ people spanning 25 branches along the East Coast of the U.S
In 2022 the company has had 6 rounds of lay offs and all current hourly employees must work only 32 hours a week

Company
The company was founded by Dennis Hardiman in 1983. A direct lender of Fannie Mae and Freddie Mac, the company is also an Equal Housing Lender and an issuer of Ginnie Mae. The company is also approved by FHA and VA.

Embrace is an approved Servicer for:
 Fannie Mae and Freddie Mac
 United States Department of Housing and Urban Development (HUD)
 Ginnie Mae

Embrace is an active member of:
 Mortgage Bankers Association (MBA)
 Direct Marketing Association (DMA)
 FNMA Regional Advisory Council

Awards 
Top 25 Mortgage Companies in America (2014)
 100 Most Influential Mortgage Executives, Kurt Noyce (2014)
 One of the Fastest-Growing Companies in Rhode Island (2013)
 The Best Place to Work in Rhode Island (2006, 2007, 2008, 2009, 2011, 2012, 2013)
 50 Best Small & Medium Companies to Work for in America (2004, 2005, 2007, 2008, 2009, 2012)
 Business Excellence Award for Community Involvement (2006)

Recent News 
With the addition of a Retail Branch Origination in 2009, as well as a Correspondent Origination Division in 2013. Embrace is continuing to expand its branches across the country, including the opening of its 20th Retail Branch Office located in Charlottesville, VA. This particular office will focus on specializing in realtor sales, as well as builder and other referral business.

In December 2017, it was announced that Kurt Noyce would lead the Financial Institution Services Division. Noyce had been President of Embrace Home Loans for 18 years.

Charity 
Employees at Embrace are offered 100 hours of paid time off if they use it to volunteer. The company also matches employee donations up to $2,500 a year per employee.

References 

Mortgage lenders of the United States
American companies established in 1983
Financial services companies established in 1983